ITVBe is a British free-to-air television channel owned by ITV Digital Channels, a division of ITV plc. The channel was first announced on 12 February 2014 and launched on 8 October 2014.  ITVBe broadcasts reality and unscripted shows, including US acquisitions such as The Real Housewives franchise, Million Dollar Listing New York and Botched; and original programming such as The Real Housewives of Cheshire, Dinner Date  and The Only Way Is Essex.

A high-definition simulcast, ITVBe HD, launched on Virgin Media on 19 November 2014, along with a one-hour timeshift feed, ITVBe +1. Both subsidiary channels were exclusive to Virgin until the ITVBe +1 service was made available on Sky and Freesat on 15 December 2014. As part of a number of changes to ITV's broadcasting, ITVBe +1 was removed from Sky and Freesat on 13 April 2021. ITVBe +1 is also available on Freeview, but only broadcasts for 1 hour during downtime hours (when ITVBe broadcasts teleshopping). Consequently as a result, the only programme ITVBe +1 on Freeview broadcasts is teleshopping.

On 7 October 2022, the ITVBe Twitter, Instagram and Facebook accounts were deleted in order to streamline the ITV channels for an upcoming rebrand that happened on 15 November. On the same day, the majority of videos uploaded on ITVBe’s YouTube account were moved to the ITVX YouTube account

Most watched programmes
The following is a list of the ten most watched episodes of a series on ITVBe since the channel began broadcasting in October 2014. Figures are based on Live +7 data supplied by BARB. The Only Way Is Essex is consistently the highest rated series on ITVBe.

Branding

2014 branding

When ITVBe launched in October 2014, it originally utilised a fun, social-media-inspired aesthetic driven by its key talent and reality-TV stars. Boldness and everyday glitz were expressed across the 12-piece mix-n-match colour palette, playful stickers and icons, and entirely unique to ITVBe: user-generated idents named "Mydents".

2022 rebranding 
In line with the launch of the streaming service ITVX, ITVBe received a new look for the first time on 15 November 2022. The logo is now coloured rose gold and uses idents that are cross-used across ITV1, ITV2, ITV3, and ITV4 with different views which reflect the channel's image and programming output.

EarlyBe
On 20 August 2020, ITV announced that EarlyBe would be introduced on the ITV Hub as part of the Autumn 2020 Reboot. Shows which would broadcast on ITVBe on the same day would be available to watch on the ITV Hub from 7am. The service started on 3 September 2020 and the first show to be hosted by the ITV Hub, before it aired on ITVBe, was Sam & Billie: The Mummy Diaries, which didn't air on ITVBe until 9pm on 3 September 2020. EarlyBe also hosts The Real Housewives of Cheshire, The Only Way Is Essex, Ferne McCann: First Time Mum and Gemma Collins: Diva.

LittleBe
On 3 September 2018, the channel introduced a new children's strand, which is dedicated to preschool programming. The strand airs every day from 9:00am to 12:00pm, three hours a day and also airs archive CITV programming such as Sooty.

References

External links
 

2014 establishments in the United Kingdom
ITV television channels
Television channels and stations established in 2014
Television channels in the United Kingdom